The Mystery of Life is the 77th album by country singer Johnny Cash, released in 1991, and his last for Mercury Records. The songs featured are culled from both recent sessions and from leftovers from Cash's first Mercury session in 1986 for the album Johnny Cash is Coming to Town.

It includes new recordings of two songs already associated with him from his Sun and Columbia days, "Hey Porter" and "Wanted Man". "I'll Go Somewhere and Sing My Songs Again" is a duet with Tom T. Hall. The album's poor performance on the charts (it peaked at #70) and that of "Goin' by the Book", the only single to chart (at #69), coupled with Cash's unsteady relationship with Mercury, ensured his departure from the label following the album's release. In 2003, the album was re-released with "The Wanderer" from U2's 1993 Island Records album Zooropa as a bonus track. In 2006, "I'm an Easy Rider" and "Beans for Breakfast" were used in the soundtrack to the video game Scarface: The World Is Yours.

According to Cash's 1997 biography, Mercury only pressed 500 copies of the album, biographer Robert Hilburn in Johnny Cash: The Life (2013) dismisses this as an exaggeration on Cash's part.

This was the final new studio album release to feature drummer W.S. "Fluke" Holland, who had been a member of Cash's backing group and featured on almost all of his recordings since the 1950s, as Holland would not participate in the recording sessions for the Johnny Cash Country Christmas or the recordings made for American Recordings, though he would continue to perform with Cash in concert.

Track listing

Personnel
Johnny Cash – vocals, acoustic guitar, backing vocals on "The Hobo Song"

Additional musicians
Jack Clement – acoustic guitar, dobro, ukulele, backing vocals on "The Hobo Song"
Mark Howard – acoustic and electric guitar, mandolin
Marty Stuart – acoustic and electric guitar, mandolin, backing vocals on "Wanted Man" and "The Mystery of Life" 
Jim Soldi – acoustic and electric guitar, backing vocals on "Wanted Man" and "The Mystery of Life" 
Kerry Marx – acoustic and electric guitar
David R. Ferguson – acoustic guitar, backing vocals on "The Hobo Song"
W.S. "Fluke" Holland, Kenny Malone, Jody Maphis – drums, percussion
Roy Huskey, Jr., Steve Logan – acoustic bass
Jimmy Tittle – electric bass, backing vocals on "Wanted Man" and "The Mystery of Life" 
Jamie Hartford – mandolin, backing vocals on "The Hobo Song"
Jack Hale Jr. – horns
Bob Lewin – horns
Irv Kane – horns, backing vocals on "The Hobo Song"
Earl Poole Ball – piano
Joey Miskulin – piano, keyboards, accordion
Mark O'Connor – fiddle
Lloyd Green – steel guitar
Anita Carter – backing vocals on "The Greatest Cowboy of Them All" and "The Hobo Song"
John Prine, Debra Deklaita, Claude L. Hill, J. Niles Clement, Pat McLaughlin, Bill Maresh, Jam Dant, Cousin Bill Clement, Jay Patten, Suzanne Sherwin, Roberto Bianco – backing vocals on "The Hobo Song"

Additional personnel
Produced by Jack Clement
"The Wanderer" produced by Flood, Brian Eno and The Edge
Assistant producer: David R. Ferguson
Executive in charge of production: Harold Shedd
Executive producers: Claudia Mize, Reba Hancock
Recording engineers: David R. Ferguson (chief engineer), Richard Adler, Jack "Stack-A-Track" Grochmal, Mark Howard, J. Niles Clement, Cousin Bob Clement
Mixed by David R. Ferguson
Assistant mixer: Mark Howard
Recorded and mixed at the Cowboy Arms Hotel and Recording Spa, Nashville, Tennessee
Music arrangements: Joey Miskulin
"Wanted Man" arranged by: Marty Stuart
Mastered by Benny Quinn at Masterfonics, INC., Nashville, Tennessee
Album design: Marlene Cohen
Photography serigraph: Alan Messer
Executive art director: Kim Markovchick
Liner notes: June Carter Cash

Reissue credits
Produced by Andy McKaie
Digitally remastered by Suha Gur, UNiversal Mastering-East
Art direction: Vartan
Design: Mike Fink @ilevel
Photo research: Ryan Null
Photos: Alan Messer
Production coordination: Beth Stempel

Charts
Album – Billboard (United States)

Singles – Billboard (United States)

References

External links
Luma Electronic entry on The Mystery of Life

Johnny Cash albums
1991 albums
Albums produced by Jack Clement
Mercury Nashville albums